Saniabad (also Romanized as S̄ānīābād) is a village in Fahraj Rural District, in the Central District of Fahraj County, Kerman Province, Iran. At the 2006 census, its population was 89, in 20 families.

References 

Populated places in Fahraj County